The voiceless labiodental fricative is a type of consonantal sound used in a number of spoken languages.

Some scholars also posit the voiceless labiodental approximant distinct from the fricative.

Features
Features of the voiceless labiodental fricative:

Occurrence

See also
 List of phonetics topics

Notes

References

External links
 

Fricative consonants
Pulmonic consonants
Voiceless oral consonants